Textual variants in the Gospel of Matthew are the subject of the study called textual criticism of the New Testament. Textual variants in manuscripts arise when a copyist makes deliberate or inadvertent alterations to a text that is being reproduced. 
An abbreviated list of textual variants in this particular book is given in this article below.

Origen, writing in the 3rd century, was one of the first who made remarks about differences between manuscripts of texts that were eventually collected as the New Testament. He declared his preferences among variant readings. Comm. ser. 121). "Gergeza" was preferred over "Geraza" or "Gadara" (Commentary on John VI.40 (24) – see Matthew 8:28).

Most of the variations are not significant and some common alterations include the deletion, rearrangement, repetition, or replacement of one or more words when the copyist's eye returns to a similar word in the wrong location of the original text. If their eye skips to an earlier word, they may create a repetition (error of dittography). If their eye skips to a later word, they may create an omission. They may resort to performing a rearranging of words to retain the overall meaning without compromising the context. In other instances, the copyist may add text from memory from a similar or parallel text in another location. Otherwise, they may also replace some text of the original with an alternative reading. Spellings occasionally change. Synonyms may be substituted. A pronoun may be changed into a proper noun (such as "he said" becoming "Jesus said"). John Mill's 1707 Greek New Testament was estimated to contain some 30,000 variants in its accompanying textual apparatus which was based on "nearly 100 [Greek] manuscripts." Peter J. Gurry puts the number of non-spelling variants among New Testament manuscripts around 500,000, though he acknowledges his estimate is higher than all previous ones.

The critical editions of the Gospel of Matthew are based on all available papyri: Papyrus 1, Papyrus 19, Papyrus 21, Papyrus 25, Papyrus 35, Papyrus 37, Papyrus 44, Papyrus 45, Papyrus 53, Papyrus 62, Papyrus 64, Papyrus 70, Papyrus 71, Papyrus 77, Papyrus 86, and on the following uncials: 01, 02, 03, 04, 05, 019, 032, 035, 038, 058, 064, 067, 071, 073, 074, 078, 084, 085, 087, 089, 090, 092a, 094, 0104, 0106, 0107, 0118, 0119, 0128, 0135, 0136, 0137, 0138, 0148, 0160, 0161, 0164, 0170, 0171, 0197, 0200, 0204, 0231, 0234, 0237, 0242, 0249, 0255, 0271, 0275.

Note: This running list of textual variants is nonexhaustive, and is continually being updated in accordance with the modern critical publications of the Greek New Testament — United Bible Societies' Fifth Revised Edition (UBS5) published in 2014, Novum Testamentum Graece: Nestle-Aland 28th Revised Edition of the Greek New Testament (NA28) published in 2012, and Novum Testamentum Graecum: Editio Critica Maior (ECM) last published in 2017 — and supplemented by nonmodern publications wherever applicable, including those of Hodges & Farstad, Greeven, Lachmann, Legg, Merk, Nestle-Aland editions 25–27, Aland's Synopsis Quattuor Evangeliorum (SQE), Souter, Swanson, Tischendorf, Tregelles, von Soden, and Westcott & Hort.

Legend

Textual variants

See also 
 Textual variants in the New Testament
 Textual variants in the Gospel of Mark
 Textual variants in the Gospel of Luke
 Textual variants in the Gospel of John
 Differences between codices Sinaiticus and Vaticanus
 Textual criticism

References

Further reading 

 Novum Testamentum Graece et Latine, ed. E. Nestle, K. Aland, Stuttgart 1981.
 Bart D. Ehrman, "The Orthodox Corruption of Scripture. The Effect of Early Christological Controversies on the Text of the New Testament", Oxford University Press, New York – Oxford, 1996, pp. 223–227.
 Bruce M. Metzger, "A Textual Commentary on the Greek New Testament: A Companion Volume to the United Bible Societies' Greek New Testament", 1994, United Bible Societies, London & New York.

External links 
 The Comparative Critical Greek New Testament
 Variantes textuais 
 Varianten Textus receptus versus Nestle-Aland (Dead link)
 The Gospel of Matthew part of the Holy Bible
 Novum Testamentum Graece. Editio Stereotipa (Lipsiae 1886)

Greek New Testament manuscripts
Biblical criticism
Gospel of Matthew
Textual criticism